Bremen High School, BHS, or simply Bremen is a public four year high school located in Midlothian, Illinois. It is the first school built as part of Bremen Community High School District 228 which also includes Tinley Park High School, Hillcrest High School and Oak Forest High School.  Bremen High School was opened in 1953 along with the creation of Bremen High School District 228 to serve students in the newly developing areas at the time.  Bremen High School is named after the township in which it is located, Bremen Township.

History
Prior to the opening of the school, students attended Thornton Township High School, Bloom Township High School, Blue Island High School, and Joliet Township High School.  Bremen High School opened in September 1953, though it was not officially dedicated until November, with Senator Everett Dirksen presiding over the dedication.  The staff consisted of 37 teachers and administrators and 732 students. Construction costs for the construction was $1,175,000.

About Bremen High School
Bremen High School was the first school to be built in district 228. The school mainly serves the communities of Midlothian, Posen, Markham and a small part of Harvey. Bremen High school is also member of the South Suburban Conference. William J. Stolz, class of 1956, was the first Bremen Graduate to be elected to the Board of Education and went to Washington D.C. as the youngest school board President in the Nation.

Athletics
The Athletic Director is Mr. Eric Washington.

Bremen competes in the South Suburban Conference and is a member of the Illinois High School Association (IHSA); the organization which governs most sports and competitive activities in the state. Teams are stylized as the Braves. School colors are red and grey. 

The school sponsors interscholastic teams for young men and women in baseball, basketball, cheerleading, cross country, football, golf, lacrosse, soccer, softball, swimming, tennis, track and field, volleyball, and wrestling. Bremen also hosts the district water polo team. While not sponsored by the IHSA, Bremen also sponsors a pom pom team.

The following teams won their respective IHSA sponsored state championship tournament/meet:

 Soccer (Boys): Sectional Champions (2007-2008)
 Poms: State Champions (2005-2006)

Activities/Clubs 
B.A.C.O, Art Club, Group Interpretation, Scholastic Bowl, Arrow (Yearbook), Interact Club, Science Club, Band, Chess Club, Key Club, Circle Book Club, Color Guard (Flag Corp), Special Interest Choir, Diversity Club, Mathletes, Speech Team, Drama, National Honor Society, Stage & Lighting, ECHO Student Newspaper,
Student Council, Energy Club, Oracle Vocational Club (BPA/DECA), F.A.C.S. Club, Pep Club, Vocational Club (FCCLA), P.R.I.S.M. / G.S.A., World Language Club, Business Prof. of America, Photo Club.

Notable alumni
 Gary Bettenhausen, former auto racing driver
 Ken Wahl, former actor and TV star
 Pete Lovrich, Former MLB player (Kansas City Athletics)
 George H. Rieke, astronomer, elected to the National Academy of Sciences in 2011.
 Maxwell Dixon, former warden for Menard Correctional Center.

References

Educational institutions established in 1953
Public high schools in Cook County, Illinois
1953 establishments in Illinois